Diocese of Newark may refer to the following ecclesiastical jurisdictions, all with see in Newark, New Jersey, USA:

 Roman Catholic Archdiocese of Newark, Metropolitan of a Latin province
 Syrian Catholic Eparchy of Our Lady of Deliverance of Newark, an Eastern Catholic diocese for the Syriac Rite in the whole US
 Episcopal Diocese of Newark